Korene Hinds (born 19 October 1976) is a Jamaican long-distance runner who specializes in the 3000 metre steeplechase.

Competition record

Personal bests
Outdoor
800 metres – 2:03.09 min (2010)
1500 metres – 4:13.68 min (2010)
3000 metres – 9:10.10 min (2000)
3000 metre steeplechase – 9:28.86 min (2007)

Indoor
1500 metres – 4:19.48 min (2008)
One mile – 4:39.76 min (2009)
3000 metres – 9:08.55 min (2003)

References

1976 births
Living people
Jamaican female long-distance runners
Athletes (track and field) at the 2008 Summer Olympics
Athletes (track and field) at the 2012 Summer Olympics
Olympic athletes of Jamaica
People from Saint Catherine Parish
Jamaican female steeplechase runners
Central American and Caribbean Games silver medalists for Jamaica
Competitors at the 2002 Central American and Caribbean Games
Central American and Caribbean Games medalists in athletics
20th-century Jamaican women
21st-century Jamaican women